Cloud fraction is the percentage of each pixel in satellite imagery or each gridbox in a weather or climate model that is covered with clouds. A cloud fraction of one means the pixel is completely covered with clouds, while a cloud fraction of zero represents a totally cloud free pixel. Cloud fraction is important for the modeling of downward radiation.

References

Numerical climate and weather models